Mrudhula Basker, also known as Naveena, is an Indian actress. She is best known for her role in the 2014 film Vallinam, directed by Arivazhagan Venkatachalam, and Ice Cream 2, directed by Ram Gopal Varma. She also performed in the Tamil movies Marumunai and Thilagar. She debuted in the Kannada film industry with the film Bablusha, directed by Venkat Bhardwaj.

Bhaskar is also the founder and artistic director of the Nrithyamoksh School of Dance where she trains people in the field Bharathanatyam.

Filmography
All films are in Tamil, unless otherwise noted.

References

External links
 

Actresses from Bangalore
Living people
Actresses in Tamil cinema
Actresses in Telugu cinema
Indian film actresses
1992 births
21st-century Indian actresses